The Shire of Miriam Vale was a local government area near Gladstone in Queensland, Australia.  The administrative centre was the town of Miriam Vale.

History

Calliope Division was created on 11 November 1879 as one of 74 divisions around Queensland under the Divisional Boards Act 1879. On 7 January 1902, the Miriam Vale Division was separated from Calliope Division.

With the passage of the Local Authorities Act 1902, Miriam Vale Division became the Shire of Miriam Vale on 31 March 1903.

Following the report of the Local Government Reform Commission released in July 2007, three former local government areas:
 City of Gladstone
 Shire of Calliope
 Shire of Miriam Vale
were amalgamated to form Gladstone Region on 15 March 2008.

Towns and localities
The Shire of Miriam Vale included the following settlements:

Towns:
 1770
 Agnes Water
 Miriam Vale (administrative centre)
Turkey Beach

Villages:
 Bororen
 Lowmead
 Rosedale

Other communities:
 Baffle Creek
 Deepwater

Economy
The Shire of Miriam Vale was a sheep growing area, and also supported timber, beef and dairy cattle. Tourism was an emerging industry within the Shire.

Chairmen
 1927: G. G. Hales

References

Further reading

External links
 

Former local government areas of Queensland
2008 disestablishments in Australia
Populated places disestablished in 2008